Mustafa Ahshad (born 20 December 1970) is a Libyan weightlifter. He competed in the 1992 Summer Olympics.

References

1970 births
Living people
Weightlifters at the 1992 Summer Olympics
Libyan male weightlifters
Olympic weightlifters of Libya